Agia Mavra may refer to various locations in Greece:
Agia Mavra, Elis, a village in Elis
Agia Mavra, Lefkada, a village in the island of Lefkada